Mar Hormizd Cathedral, locally known as the Eastern Church of Angamaly or the Cathedral Church, is a Syro-Malabar church in Angamaly, India. It was created cathedral in 1577 by Mar Abraham, the last East Syriac Metropolitan to reach Malabar Coast. It is one of the oldest and is historically the most important of the three ancient Syrian churches in Angamaly. It is dedicated to Mar Hormizd, a seventh-century East Syriac saint.

The Chaldean bishop Mar Abraham was ordained as the Archbishop of Angamali and Rabban Hormiz Church was the Cathedral church. Mar Abraham came to Malabar in 1570, as a Chaldean Catholic Archbishop, after being previously imprisoned by the Portuguese in Goa. Angamaly, being a centre of Saint Thomas Christians and being an inland settlement ruled by native kings, provided a safer headquarters to the Chaldean archbishop and therefore he settled Angamaly as his episcopal see to govern the Syro-Malabar Church of India. Its jurisdiction extended all over the Indian subcontinent until the 16th century. This title denotes a quasi-patriarchal status with all India jurisdiction. The church houses the tomb of Mar Abraham who died in 1597. The most ancient school (university in Portuguese accounts) for Malpan (ecclesiastical) training was functioning at Angamaly next to the Cathedral Church, much before the arrival of the Portuguese. Following the death of Mar Abraham, the padroado Roman Catholics, led by Archbishop of Goa Alexis de Menesis, managed to block the arrival of further Syriac bishops and succeeded in organising the Synod of Diamper, a pseudo-diocesan synod, and forcibly brought the Syro-Malabar Christians under their jurisdiction. The Synod questioned the status of the cathedral, anathematized Rabban Hormizd and decreed to replace the patron saint's name and commemorations with that of Hormizd the Martyr. The church, however, retained that cathedral status until Francisco Roz moved the diocesan headquarters to Kodungallur.

History

Mar Hormizd Church, the Metropolitan Church
After having made a successful escape from the Portuguese detention in Goa, Mar Abraham returned to Angamaly in 1570. In the same year, Mar Abraham started to construct his Cathedral Church in patronage of Rabban Hormizd, a seventh-century Abbot of the East Syriac Church, as its patron.

In 1578, as a response to the requests made on the part of the Jesuit missionaries who had been working in Angamaly and in the other centres of the Christians of St. Thomas, the pope sent plenary indulgences to the Cathedral of Rabban Hormizd which the faithful could obtain four times a year for 25 years from the year of the election of the Metropolitan Mar Abraham. The indulgences covered two feasts of the Patron Rabban Hormizd that fell on the fifteenth day after Easter (Monday) and on the first of September. As requested by Mar Abraham, the Jesuits laid the foundation stone of a new Cathedral Rabban Hormizd in the same place that was chosen by the Metropolitan.

Accounts by some authors
Antonio de Gouvea, in his book Jornada do Arcebispo de Goa Dom Frey Aleixo de Meneses (1606), the travelogue of Alexis de Menezes the padroado Archbishop of Goa who convened the Synod of Diamper, gives an account of the churches in Angamaly:
 

Anquetil Du Perron, who visited Malabar in the eighteenth century, gives the following list and description of churches in Angamaly in the country of the Velutha Thavali ruler:
 Church of the Holy Virgin (valiyapalli or Great Church) co-owned by Syrian Catholics and schismatics (the present St George Syro-Malabar Catholic Basilica). It has a chapel dedicated to Saint George (now defunct) in which both Syrian Catholics and schismatics celebrate their liturgies one after the other.
 Another church dedicated to Saint Hormisdas the Martyr. It is used exclusively by the Syrian Catholics. It was the Cathedral church of the diocese before its see was moved to Cranganore.
 Another church which is also dedicated to the Holy Virgin. It is known locally as the Cheriyapally (Minor Church). It is the headquarters of Archdeacon Thoma I and it is used exclusively by the schismatics. It is the present day St. Mary's Jacobite Church.

He then mentions a fourth church in the country of the Velutha Thavali, which is at Akaparambu and dedicated to Saint Gervasis, co-owned by Syrian Catholics and schismatics. Now the original church in Akaparambu went to the Jacobites while the Syro-Malabar Catholics constructed their own church in the property allotted to them. Meanwhile the Great Church of Angamaly became exclusive to the Catholics and the Jacobites received the Minor Church of Angamaly.

Gallery

See also
 St. George Syro-Malabar Catholic Basilica, Angamaly
 Kottakkavu Mar Thoma Syro-Malabar Pilgrim Church, North Paravur
 India (ecclesiastical province)

References

Sources
 
 
 
 
 

Syro-Malabar Catholic cathedrals
Churches in Angamaly
Eastern Catholic churches in Kerala
Churches completed in 1583
1577 establishments in Asia